Puli Khumrī, also spelled Pul-i-Khumri or Pol-e Khomri, is a city in northern Afghanistan. Puli Khumri is the capital and largest city of Baghlan Province, whose name comes from the other major town in the province, Baghlan. The city has an estimated population of about 221,274 as of 2015, making it about the 9th-largest city of Afghanistan, and the second-largest city in northeastern Afghanistan after Kunduz. It is a major industrial city.

History

As of 2017, Taliban insurgents are active in the Dand-e-Shahabuddin part of Puli Khumri. On 5 May 2019, Taliban members stormed the city's police headquarters, killing 13 police. On 1 September 2019, Taliban assaulted the city, but were repelled by the Afghan Army. On 16 January 2021, the district's NDS chief Fazal Wakilzada was killed in a Taliban attack.

On 10 August 2021, Puli Khumri became the eighth provincial capital to be captured by the Taliban as part of their nationwide military offensive.

Geography

Land use

As of 2015, Puli Khumri had 6 districts and a total land area of 3,752 hectares. The total number of dwellings in the city was 24,586. Agricultural lands account for the largest land use in Puli Khumri (65%), with the majority of that land in Districts 3, 5, and 6. Districts 1 and 2 have the highest dwelling densities but District 5 is home to the most dwelling units. Puli Khumri has a diverse housing stock consisting of regular, irregular, and hillside houses as well as apartment buildings.

Climate
With an influence from the local steppe climate, Puli Khumri features a cold semi-arid climate (BSk) under the Köppen climate classification. The average temperature in Puli Khumri is 15.9 °C, while the annual precipitation averages 282 mm.

July is the hottest month of the year with an average temperature of 28.5 °C. The coldest month January has an average temperature of 3.0 °C.

Demographics

Economy
There are two dams in Puli Khumri, which provide the necessary electricity.

Afghanistan's first cement factory, Ghori I Cement Factory, was built in 1954 in Puli Khumri with financial support from Czechoslovakia. It is currently owned and operated by Afghan Invest Co., and operated by Ahmad Javid Jaihoon. The limestone is mined from the hill behind the factory.

There is a coal mine outside of the city in the village Kar-kar, but the production system is archaic.
 
Agriculture is very important because of the rain and temperature; wheat, spices, and rice are the main crops.

Provincial Reconstruction Team
The lead nation of the local Provincial Reconstruction Team (PRT) was Hungary, which operated in the city from 2006 to March 2013. Previous to 2006, the lead nation was the Netherlands.

Electrical transmission lines built from Puli Khumri are now bringing a steady supply of electricity to Kabul.

See also
Baghlan Province

References

Populated places in Baghlan Province
Baghlan Province
Provincial capitals in Afghanistan
Cities in Afghanistan
Populated places with period of establishment missing